Suleman Adamu Sanid (born November 13, 1970) is a Ghanaian politician and member of the Seventh Parliament of the Fourth Republic of Ghana and the 8th Parliament of the Fourth Republic of Ghana, representing the Ahafo Ano North Constituency in the Ashanti Region on the ticket of the New Patriotic Party.

Early life and education 
Suleman hails from Worikambo in the Garu-Tempane District in the Upper East region of Ghana. He had his WAEC Ordinary Level in 1988. He also holds MBA (Marketing) from the Central University in Accra; BA (History), University of Ghana - Legon in 1997.

Career 
Suleman was the acting Manager of Organizational Development and Management System at Volta River Authority.

Political career 
Suleman is a member of NPP. Until his election into the Seventh Parliament of the Fourth Republic of Ghana, Suleman pulled 18,895 votes out of 37,478 representing 51.11% to beat his main contender of the National Democratic Congress, Kwasi Adusei who pulled 14,479 representing 9.16% in the 2016 General Election. He was re-elected in the 2020 Election to represent in the 8th Parliament of the Fourth Republic of Ghana. He had 21,581 votes making 50.67% of the total votes whilst the NDC parliamentary candidate Kwasi Adusei had 19,013 votes making 44.64% of the total votes.

Committees 
Suleman is the vice-chairperson of the Local Government and Rural Development Committee, a member of the Poverty Reduction Strategy Committee and also a member of the Privileges Committee.

Personal life 
Suleman is married with three children  He is a Christian.

References

Ghanaian MPs 2017–2021
1970 births
Living people
Ghanaian Muslims
New Patriotic Party politicians
Ghanaian MPs 2021–2025